was a Japanese photographer, prominent in the years before the war.

He was an active contributor to the magazine  and in Japan Photography Association (Nihon Kōga Kyōkai), created in 1928 and a successor to the Japan Photographic Art Association (Nihon Kōga Geijutsu Kyōkai).

Tamura is particularly known for his portraits, and Shiroi hana (White flower, 1931) is the best known of these and widely anthologized. Okatsuka says that it expresses a certain lyricism but “displays a more sophisticated sense of maturity” than the works of his contemporaries Masataka Takayama and Jun Watanabe.

Books by Tamura

Seibutsu shashin no utsushikata. Tokyo: Sōgeisha, 1952. A guide to photographing still lifes.
Sakuga no daiippo. Tokyo: Genkōsha, 1954. A guide to the practice of photography.

Notes

Sources

Kaneko Ryūichi. “The Origins and Development of Japanese Art Photography.” Pp. 100–42 of Tucker, ed., History. Pp. 110–13, 137. 
Matsuda Takako. “Tamura Sakae”. In Tucker, ed., History, p. 363. 
Matsumoto Norihiko., ed. A Collection of Japanese Photographs 1912–1940. Tokyo: Shashinkosha, 1990.  Despite its English-only title, the book is in Japanese only. It is a lavish production (if unpaginated), not offered for sale  and instead presumably distributed to customers.
Nihon kindai shashin no seiritsu to tenkai / The Founding and Development of Modern Photography in Japan. Tokyo: Tokyo Museum of Photography, 1995. 
Nihon no shashinka / Biographic Dictionary of Japanese Photography. Tokyo: Nichigai Associates, 2005. .  Despite the English-language alternative title, all in Japanese.
Taidan: Shashin kono gojūnen (Discussions: The last fifty years of photography). Edited by the staff of Asahi Camera. Tokyo: Asahi Shinbunsha, 1974.   Ihei Kimura interviews Tamura in chapter 7, "Shinkō shashin tezukuri no aji".
Tucker, Anne Wilkes, et al. The History of Japanese Photography. New Haven: Yale University Press, 2003. . 

1906 births
1987 deaths
Japanese photographers
Portrait photographers
People from Ōtsu, Shiga
Writers on photographic techniques